Common Ground is a 2014 book by Justin Trudeau, the current Prime Minister of Canada. Written while he served as Leader of the Liberal Party of Canada, Common Ground is a memoir of the experiences that shaped Trudeau from his childhood at 24 Sussex Drive through to his entry to Parliament and leadership of the Liberal Party.

Background and synopsis
The book was described by CBC as "widely seen as his attempt to define himself before his political opponents do it for him" and is both a political and personal memoir. Trudeau addresses his childhood, the breakup of the marriage of his parents Pierre and Margaret Trudeau, his mother's struggle with mental health issues, the death of his brother Michel, and his decision to run for public office.

Reception
In The Tyee, Crawford Kilian labelled the book a Bildungsroman, writing that the biography was "a readable book that should be read, whatever your political views" and "his book reveals him as a very intelligent, observant, outgoing man, likely a smarter politician than his father ever was".

References

External links
 on Internet Archive

2014 non-fiction books
Books about politics of Canada
Canadian memoirs
Political memoirs
HarperCollins books